2021 Mogadishu bombing may refer to:

March 2021 Mogadishu bombing
June 2021 Mogadishu bombing
November 2021 Mogadishu bombing